Lin Che-yu (born 11 February 1993) is a Taiwanese footballer who currently plays as a defensive midfielder at the national and club level.

References

1993 births
Living people
Taiwanese footballers
Chinese Taipei international footballers
Association football midfielders
Footballers from Taichung